Terminus Longueuil is a Réseau de transport métropolitain bus terminus, part of the Longueuil–Université-de-Sherbrooke Metro complex, in Longueuil, Quebec, Canada, on the south shore of the Saint Lawrence River across from Montreal.

The bus terminus has 41 numbered platforms in 7 lettered sections, mostly used by Greater Montreal transit agencies with some intercity coach services.

Connecting bus routes

Réseau de transport de Longueuil

Exo Sorel-Varennes sector

Exo Le Richelain sector

Exo Chambly-Richelieu-Carignan sector 

Service to Chambly, Richelieu, Carignan and Marieville

Exo de la Vallée du Richelieu sector

Exo  Roussillon sector

Exo Sainte-Julie sector

Intercity buses

See also 
 ARTM park and ride lots
 Longueuil–Université-de-Sherbrooke (Montreal Metro)

References

External links 

 RTL Terminus Longueuil
 RTL official website in English
 Orléans Express
 Orléans Express, Schedules
 Limocar intercity transport

 Groupe Bourgeois

Transport in Longueuil
Longueuil
Buildings and structures in Longueuil